Tappert is a surname. Notable people with the surname include:

 Fred Tappert (1940–2002), American physicist
 Georg Tappert (1880–1957), German expressionist painter
 Horst Tappert (1923–2008), German movie and television actor
 Wilhelm Tappert (1830–1907), German composer and music writer